KOFM (103.1 MHz) is an FM radio station based in Enid, Oklahoma. Located in Enid, Oklahoma, home of Vance Air Force in the United States. The station goes under the moniker as "1031 KOFM Continuous Country Favorites".

History
The heritage KOFM call letters were on an Oklahoma City Top 40 station on 104.1. KOFM dropped its format in 1986 to become AC "Magic 104" KMGL. The owners of Enid station KUAL (for "Quality Radio") saw a local opportunity for a better callsign, and switched their station from beautiful music to a top 40 format—and applied for the recently abandoned KOFM call letters. KOFM originally launched with the slogan "Maximum Music".

KOFM original on-air talent was JJ Scott in mornings, Frank Baker in Afternoons, also Keith Hillyard and J. Curtis Huckleberry. Beyond those day parts, much of KOFM was automated. Airing a diverse mix of Top 40 music, KOFM became one of the most popular radio stations in NW Oklahoma and its “Maximum Music Machine” remote broadcast vehicle could be found throughout NW Oklahoma.

In 1992, KOFM switched to Contemporary Country, a format that remains today. It is one of two live and local radio stations along with KGWA 960 AM serving Enid and the surrounding area reaching into 14 counties. It features the Clepper in the Morning radio show. In recent years, KOFM has been recognized as "Station of the Year" by the Oklahoma Association of Broadcasters and a Marconi Award finalist as "Small Market Station of the Year" by the National Association of Broadcasters.

External links
 KOFM official website
 
 
 

Country radio stations in the United States
OFM
Radio stations established in 1986
1986 establishments in Oklahoma